Danny Kelly (born 23 December 1956) is a British music journalist, sports presenter, and internet publisher. He is the former editor of the music weekly New Musical Express and Q magazine.

Early life
Danny Kelly was born in Islington to Irish parents and attended Our Lady of Sacred Heart in Eden Grove and then St Aloysius College, Highgate. Kelly has worked in print and radio journalism for over twenty years. He began writing for New Musical Express in about 1983 and was its editor from the late 1980s to 1992. After that he edited the British music monthly, Q, and was awarded the title British Magazine Editor of the Year for his work there. He left in 1995. He also launched the sports monthly Total Sport. He often works in partnership with fellow sports fan and radio journalist Danny Baker, who is also an NME alumnus, having broadcast in both local/national commercial and BBC radio.

Career
In the mid-1990s Kelly hosted Under the Moon, a live late-night television sports chat and entertainment show that often ran for three or more hours. In 1997, he founded the 365 Corporation, best known for the leading UK football website, Football365.

In 2006, he helped launch Videojugs, a video up/download service that seeks to demonstrate all human knowledge on film. He also launched The Times''' first weekly podcast, The Game. He currently presents an award-winning radio sports show on BBC London and hosted a weekly football podcast with Danny Baker. The football podcast ended in December 2007.
He has appeared in two films: Divorcing Jack and The Football Factory.

Kelly spent a period of time commencing December 2007 as stand-in presenter for Hawksbee & Jacobs, Evening Kick Off and George Galloway on talkSPORT radio. He joined the station to front Lets kick the ball during Euro 2008 between 19:00-22:00 (BST/GMT) every weekday. Kelly signed a permanent contract with talkSPORT in early August to front the same slot during the regular football season. Kelly often remarks that he played football in his youth on Hackney Marshes.

After several seasons presenting The Full Time Phone-In on Saturday nights up to 2020, and hosting a Sunday evening show with ex-Crystal Palace owner Simon Jordan, he currently presents a Monday evening show called the PressBox, where he and the football editor of The Sun Sean Custis, are joined by "a behemoth of Fleet Street to pick apart the stories that have been filling our back pages" and Trans-Euro Express'' on Sunday nights, a programme rounding up  European football.

In 2013, Kelly and Danny Baker were announced as part of BT Sport's football coverage, hosting a Friday evening show.

Since August 2021 he has presented The Athletic's Tottenham Hotspur podcast, The View From The Lane.

Controversies

On 8 January 2011, Danny Kelly referred to Rafael Benitez as a 'nonce' live on air during a Talk Sport broadcast. OFCOM received 130 complaints about the comments.

Personal life

His long term partner is the journalist Alex Clark. They both relocated to Ireland in 2018, from where Kelly often broadcasts remotely. On 9 December 2021, he announced via his Twitter account that they had married.

References

External links
Danny Kelly's personal blog

1956 births
Living people
People from Islington (district)
National Football League announcers
British television presenters
British music journalists
British popular music
English journalists
NME writers